Tanymecini is a tribe of broad-nosed weevils in the beetle family Curculionidae, subfamily Entiminae.

Subtribes and genera

Piazomiina

 Achlainomus G. R. Waterhouse, 1853
 Aphaeromias Nasreddinov, 1978
 Atmetonychus Schönherr, 1840
 Dereodus Schönherr, 1823
 Dyscheres Pascoe, 1883
 Farsomias G.A.K. Marshall, 1944
 Geotragus Schönherr, 1845
 Herpisticus Germar, 1823
 Hyperomias G.A.K. Marshall, 1916
 Hypomeces Schönherr, 1823
 Indomias G.A.K. Marshall, 1941
 Kirgisomias Bajtenov, 1974
 Lepidospyris G.A.K. Marshall, 1916
 Lepropus Schönherr, 1823
 Leptomias Faust, 1886
 Meteutinopus Zumpt, 1931
 Molybdotus Fairmaire, 1882
 Odontomias Y-Q. Chen, 1991
 Orthomias Faust, 1885
 Pachynotus Kollar & L. Redtenbacher, 1844
 Parageotragus Magnano, 2009
 Piazomias Schönherr, 1840
 Polyclaeis Boheman, 1840
 Strophosomoides Aslam, 1966
 Sympiezomias Faust, 1887
 Triangulomias Y-Q. Chen, 1991
 Xizanomias Chao, 1980
 Xylinophorus Faust, 1885

Tainophthalmina
 Amomphus Schönherr, 1848
 Amystax Roelofs, 1873
 Aspidiotes Schönherr, 1847
 Enaptorhinus G. R. Waterhouse, 1853
 Lechrioderus Faust, 1890
 Psalidimomphus Reitter, 1913
 Tainophthalmus Desbrochers, 1873

Tanymecina

 Acrocoelopus G.A.K. Marshall, 1916
 Anemeroides G.A.K. Marshall, 1916
 Cercophorus Chevrolat, 1880
 Chlorophanus Schönherr in Sahlberg, 1823
 Cycloderes Schönherr in Sahlberg, 1823
 Diglossotrox Lacordaire, 1863
 Esamus Chevrolat, 1880
 Hauserella Reitter, 1903
 Krauseus Supare, 1990
 Megamecus Reitter, 1903
 Meotiorhynchus Sharp, 1896
 Mythecops Reitter, 1916
 Phacephorus Schönherr, 1840
 Phaenoderus Péringuey, 1892
 Protenomus Schoenherr, 1826
 Pseudotanymecus Voss, 1932
 Scepticus Roelofs, 1873
 Tanymecus Germar, 1817 i c g b
 Xerodelphax Korotyaev, 1992

Tanymecini incertae sedis
 Amotus Casey, 1888 i c g b
 Hadromeropsis Pierce, 1913 i c g b
 Homoeotrachelus Faust, 1886
 Isodacrys Sharp, 1911 i c g b
 Isodrusus Sharp, 1911 c g b
 Miloderoides Van Dyke, 1936 i c g b
 Minyomerus Horn in Leconte, 1876 i c g b
 Pandeleteinus Champion, 1911 i c g b
 Pandeleteius Schönherr, 1834 i c g b
 Piscatopus Sleeper, 1960
 Trigonoscutoides O'Brien, 1977 i c g b
 Scalaventer Howden, 1970 c g b

Data sources: i = ITIS, c = Catalogue of Life, g = GBIF, b = Bugguide.net

References

 Lacordaire, T. 1863: Histoire Naturelle des Insectes. Genera des Coléoptères ou exposé méthodique et critique de tous les genres proposés jusqu'ici dans cet ordre d'insectes. Vol.: 6. Roret. Paris: 637 pp.
 Anderson, R.S. 2008: A new species of flightless Hadromeropsis from the Colombian páramo (Coleoptera: Curculionidae; Entiminae; Tanymecini). Zootaxa, 1879: 65–68.

External links 

Entiminae